The 338th Infantry Division was a division of the German Army in World War II.

In 1944, the division was in southern France, and fought against the Western Allies in Operation Dragoon.

Order of Battle 1944
757th Fortress Grenadier Regiment (two battalions)
758th Fortress Grenadier Regiment (two battalions)
759th Fortress Grenadier Regiment (two battalions)
338th Artillery Regiment (three battalions)
338th Panzerjäger Battalion
338th Reconnaissance Battalion
338th Pioneer Battalion
338th Signals Battalion

Commanders 
The following commanders commanded the 338th Infantry Division:

 10 Nov 1942 to 5 Jan 1944: Generalleutnant  Josef Folttmann
 5 Jan 1944 to 18 Sep 1944: Generalleutnant  René de l'Homme de Courbière
 18 Sep 1944 to Oct 1944: Generalmajor Hans Oschmann
 Oct 1944: Oberst Hafner
 Oct 1944 to 14 Nov 1944: Generalmajor Hans Oschmann
 14 Nov 1944 to 29 Dec 1944: Colonel of Reserves Rudolf von Oppen
 29 Dec 1944 to 18 Jan 1945: Oberst Konrad Barde
 18 Jan 1945 to Apr 1945: Generalmajor Wolf Ewert

Divisional Insignia 
The divisional emblem is described as "A shield divided into two halves. The left half shows a blue and white diamond pattern design. The right half two black swords crossed on a white background."

References

Infantry divisions of Germany during World War II
Military units and formations established in 1944
Military units and formations disestablished in 1944